ADNP may refer to:

Arab Democratic Nasserist Party, a political party in Egypt
ADNP (gene), activity-dependent neuroprotector homeobox protein, a human protein